Erika Davies, also professionally credited as Miss Erika Davies (born January 20, 1981), is an American jazz vocalist and actress. A San Diego-based performer singer-songwriter, Davies resides In California and gigs regularly.

Vocal stylings

Davies sings in a retro, jazz, folk and lounge style. She is best known for her vocals on "I Love You, I Do", which was used in a US-wide car commercial by Subaru.

Miss Davies has performed since 2004 mainly in the San Diego area and has released 5 albums. All Of Erika Davies' Albums: Creecho Habecktoe 2007, Galaxy Lakes 2011, Part The Sea 2013, In Love With Someone 2015 and Supernatural 2021 are available on iTunes, bandcamp and Amazon.com.

Acting

In 2016, Erika Davies starred in her first film "Cavern" titled after her ukulele song of the same name. The film was accepted into Cannes Film Festival Court Métrage.

Awards and nominations

 "Galaxy Lakes" nominated "Best Jazz Album" at the 2011 San Diego Music Awards.
 Won "Best Jazz Artist" 2012 San Diego Music Awards.
 "Part The Sea" nominated "Best Jazz Album", 2013 San Diego Music Awards.
 "In Love With Someone" nominated "Best Jazz Album", 2015 San Diego Music Awards.
 Nominated "Best Jazz" Artist, 2019 San Diego Music Awards

Other activities 
Apart from her career as a performer and musician, Davies is a fashion designer of handmade clothing, marketed under the label "Spicy Toast".

Discography 
 Creecho Habecktoe, Old Ditties and New (2008)
 Galaxy Lakes (2011)
 Part The Sea (2013)
 In Love With Someone (2015)
 I Am Love (2017)
 “Supernatural” (2021)

Sources and References 

1981 births
Living people
Musicians from San Diego
Musicians from Mesa, Arizona
American women singer-songwriters
Singer-songwriters from California
21st-century American singers
21st-century American women singers
Singer-songwriters from Arizona